Sir Thomas Lea, 1st Baronet (17 January 1841 – 9 January 1902) was an English carpet manufacturer from Kidderminster, and a Liberal Party politician.

Family history
Thomas Lea was born at The Larches, near Kidderminster, in 1841, the eldest son of George Butcher Lea. He came from a family which had manufactured Kidderminster stuff and bombazine in the 17th and 18th centuries.  His ancestor Francis Lea with son John Lea went over to carpet weaving in 1781.  When Francis retired from this firm, he and his second son Thomas Lea set up a worsted spinning business in Callows Lane, Kidderminster.  Francis' daughter married William Butcher, and their son George Butcher later joined the firm.  In 1831 George formed the firm of Butcher, Worth and Holmes to manufacture carpets.  In 1835 Thomas gave his spinning business to his nephew George Butcher, who later took the name George Butcher Lea.

Carpet business
George Butcher Lea withdrew from the carpet business in 1838, and his son Thomas grew up in the business and then took control of it.  He then built Slingfield Mills at Kidderminster in 1864.  He retired in favour of his sons (who formed a company) in 1892 (they later sold the company in 1920).

Politics
Lea was chosen as the Liberal candidate for Kidderminster in 1868, only 27 years old, and won by a large margin. He held the seat until 1874, and later represented County Donegal from 1880 to 1885 and County Londonderry South from 1886 to 1900. While in Ireland, Lea expressed hostility to the Irish language; he proposed an amendment to the draft of the second Home Rule Bill that would have prevented the passing of laws which would increase Irish language use in state schools, legal courts and other public spheres. He was a Justice of the Peace. In 1892, he was created a baronet, of The Larches in Kidderminster in the County of Worcester and of Sea Grove in Dawlish in the County of Devon.

Family
Lea married, in 1864, Louisa Birch, daughter of William Birch, of Barton-under-Needwood, Staffordshire. They had two sons and a daughter. The eldest son, Sir Thomas Sydney Lea (1867-1946) succeeded as baronet, and was a barrister. The younger son, Rev. Percy Lea, was a priest.

Lea died at Kidderminster on 9 January 1902, aged 60.

References 

 Kidd, Charles, Williamson, David (editors). Debrett's Peerage and Baronetage (1990 edition). New York: St Martin's Press, 1990.

External links 
 

1841 births
1902 deaths
Baronets in the Baronetage of the United Kingdom
Liberal Party (UK) MPs for English constituencies
UK MPs 1868–1874
UK MPs 1874–1880
UK MPs 1880–1885
UK MPs 1886–1892
UK MPs 1892–1895
UK MPs 1895–1900
British textile industry businesspeople
Members of the Parliament of the United Kingdom for County Donegal constituencies (1801–1922)
Members of the Parliament of the United Kingdom for County Londonderry constituencies (1801–1922)
Liberal Unionist Party MPs for Irish constituencies
19th-century English businesspeople